Sam Reynolds (born 4 June 1991 in Cuckfield, West Sussex England) is a Professional freeride Mountain biker. Known for his Best Trick award in 2015 Red Bull Rampage event when he did a superman over a 72'ft Canyon Gap. He also later performed a trick the "rock solid" in the same event.

Sponsors 
Current Bike Sponsor, NS Bikes, Monster Energy

Achievement 

2013
 Won 2 FMB Contest
 4th Stuttgart Bike Fest
 3rd at Crankworx L2A 2014
 5th at Leogang 26trix
 7th overall FMB
 5th City 8 Quebec

2014
 1st Whitestyle
 3rd 26trix
 2nd Vienna air king
 2nd Adidas ride the sky
 1st Jack gear invitational
 2nd Bergline
 3rd Crankworx Europe
 1st Night harvest
P

References
 https://web.archive.org/web/20150211120553/http://urteamracing.com/sam-reynolds/
 http://www.fmbworldtour.com/en/Athletes/540/Sam-Reynolds.html

English male cyclists
1991 births
Living people
Freeride mountain bikers